Endemol Southern Star (also known as Southern Star Endemol until February 2004) was an Australian television production company made up of a joint venture between Australian production company Southern Star Group and its Dutch production company Endemol. On 23 February 2004, Southern Star Endemol changed its name to Endemol Southern Star with both names switching their places. In 2010 the joint company ceased to exist after Endemol bought Southern Star from Fairfax in January 2009. Following this, all programmes under the ESS name were credited to Southern Star.

Programs
Big Brother Australia – Network Ten (2001–2008), Nine Network (2012–2014), Seven Network (2020–present) as Endemol Shine Australia
Y? – Nine Network (1999–2002)
Burgo's Catch Phrase – Nine Network (1997–2004)
Deal or No Deal – Seven Network (2003–2013, joint by a Seven News production)
Fear Factor – Nine Network (2002)
Shafted – Nine Network (2002)
Friday Night Games – Network Ten (2006)
The Power of One – The Comedy Channel (2006–2007)
Ready Steady Cook – Network Ten (2005–2013)
The Up-Late Game Show – Network Ten (2005)
1 vs. 100 – Nine Network (2007–2008)
Download – Network Ten (2007–2008)
Gladiators – Seven Network (2008)
Wipeout Australia – Nine Network (2009)
Beauty and the Geek Australia – Seven Network (2009–2014)

References

External links
 Southern Star Group

Television production companies of Australia
Southern Star
Banijay
2009 establishments in Australia
2013 disestablishments in Australia
Australian companies established in 2009
Mass media companies established in 2009
Mass media companies disestablished in 2013